Jim McArthur (born 27 February 1952) is a Scottish former football goalkeeper, who played for Hibernian for the majority of his career. He appeared in 296 Scottish Football League and cup games for the club. He played in the 1974 Scottish League Cup Final and the twice-replayed 1979 Scottish Cup Final.

Since retiring as a player, McArthur has become a licensed agent, having represented many players, such as Colin Cameron, Paul Ritchie, Jonathan Gould, Keith Wright, David Robertson, and Russell Latapy.

References

External links 

Jim McArthur, www.ihibs.co.uk

Mass Hibsteria profile

Cowdenbeath F.C. players
Association football goalkeepers
Greenock Morton F.C. players
Hibernian F.C. players
Living people
Livingston F.C. players
Footballers from Dunfermline
Raith Rovers F.C. players
Scottish Football League players
Scottish footballers
British sports agents
1952 births